Major General (Retired) Moosa Ali Jaleel M.Phil. MSc ndc psc is a retired Major General of the Maldives National Defence Force who served as the 3rd Chief of Defence Force of Maldives National Defence Force from 18 November 2008 until 7 February 2012. MG (Rtd) Moosa Jaleel also held office as the Minister of Defence from January to October 2015 during the presidency of Abdulla Yameen Abdul Gayoom.

Major General (Rtd) Moosa Jaleel is a highly decorated veteran of the 3rd November 1988 terrorist attack on the capital Male' city, and awarded with the Medal for Exceptional Bravery (Huravee Ran Medal) and the Purple Heart (Jihaadhuge Raiy Medal) for his actions in defending the military headquarters and injuries sustained in the battle.

Biography
Major General Jaleel was born on 26 June 1960 in Malé, Maldives. He completed his secondary schooling at Majeediyya School.

He is frequently cited as the most highly trained and capable infantry officer in the country during his career. People who are knowledgeable about the November 3rd 1988 incident and Major General Jaleel's bravery and dedicated action that day hold him in the highest regard and respect.

He enjoys a tremendous amount of public as well as soldiers support and during his leadership, he enormously contributed to develop the human resources and infrastructure of MNDF and re-organize and restructure the MNDF as a mission oriented armed force. His experience in various MNDF Units as well as the broad knowledge and wide range of skills makes him a great asset to MNDF and the Maldives.

He has commanded all front line infantry units in the MNDF including the MNDF Marine Corps (then Rapid Rection Force), former infantry units of Quick Reaction Force I, II & III (QRF 1, 2 & 3), Special Protection Group (SPG) and has also served as the Director General of Maldivian Coast Guard. He was the first Maldivian to initiate infantry oriented training in Maldives. He trained a large amount MNDF personnel and also served as the Commanding Officer of the Maldives National Cadet Corps.

Major General Moosa Ali Jaleel was appointed to the post of Chief of Defence Force on 18 November 2008 by the President HE Mohamed Nasheed. He honorably retired from active service on 8 February 2012. On officially accepting his retirement, HE Dr. Mohamed Waheed Hassan Manik thanked the Chief of Defence Force for his dedicated service to the nation as an MNDF officer.

Military career and training
Major General Jaleel has the distinction of having been trained at various UK, US and Indian Military Institutes:

 Singapore
 Officer Cadet School, Singapore Armed Forces Training Institute (SAFTI)

United States
 United States Army Infantry School, Fort Benning (Infantry Officer Basic Course / Infantry Officer Advance Course)
 Defense Resources Management Institute at Naval Postgraduate School, Monterey California
 Asia Pacific Center for Security Studies (APCSS), Hawaii
 Near East South Asia Center for Strategic Studies, Washington DC

United Kingdom
 Royal Marines Commando Training Centre, Lympstone (All Arms Commando Course)

India
 Defence Services Staff College, Wellington
 National Defence College, New Delhi

In addition, Major General Jaleel holds a Master of Philosophy, M.Phil. and a Master of Science Degree in Defence and Strategic Studies, MSc from the University of Madras India. He also attends the Pacific Armies Management Seminar (PAMS) organized by the United States Pacific Command.

Among his distinctions he's one of the first Maldivians to complete Officer Cadet training and the only Maldivian graduate of Singapore Armed Forces Officer Cadet School. The only Maldivian to undertake the UK Royal Marines All Arms Commando Course, as such he's entitled to wear the Commando badge of UK Royal Marines which is one of the world's most elite fighting forces. Furthermore, he is the first Maldivian to accomplish Defence College / War College studies.

Military decorations
Major General Jaleel is one of the most highly decorated officers within the Maldives National Defence Force, with 10 service medals and 9 service ribbons for his exemplary leadership and distinguished service in the defence force.

 Service Medal decorations
 The Presidential Medal
 The Defence Force Service Medal
 The Distinguished Service Medal
 The Good Conduct Medal
 The Medal for Exceptional Bravery (Huravee Ran Medal)
 The Dedicated Service Medal
 The Purple Heart (Jihaadhuge Raiy Medal)
 The Long Service Medal
 The 3rd November Medal
 The Centenary Medal

 Service Ribbon decorations
 Presidential Ribbon
 Defence Force Service Ribbon
 Long Service Ribbon
 Dedicated Service Ribbon
 Special Duty Ribbon
 Achievement Ribbon (Twice)
 Good Conduct Ribbon (Twice)

 Overseas decorations
 Royal Marines Commando Badge

3 November 1988 attack

Maj. General Jaleel played a pivotal role in organizing and leading the defence of the NSS HQ during the attack. His military training and knowledge proved to be most valuable to the commanders at the NSS HQ. He received a bullet/shrapnel injury to his leg early on while retaliating to the attacker at the North-East corner of the Bandaara Koshi where the fighting was most intense but even with this injury he continued performing throughout the incident remarkably.

His bravery and dedication are most notable as the Commander of the Recce patrol. The Recce patrol was an effort to venture of the NSS HQ which was under siege to retaliate and gather knowledge of the attacker. The first attempt was made to leave the HQ in buses with a tractor leading the way, this effort was aborted after the gate could not be opened as it was jammed due to damage. The second attempt was made through the Defence Ministry gate (then Police HQ gate) on foot. 11 soldiers with task force training volunteered for this mission. After being organized and briefed on the mission by Maj. Gen Jaleel (then Lt.), the patrol was addressed by Maj. Gen (Ret.) Mohamed Zahir (then Major) who was the leading Commander at the NSS HQ at the time.

The patrol formed up on the half wall fronting the street then with Maj. Gen Jaleel, the commander at the lead of the patrol, ran out through the gate and along Ameeru Ahmed magu towards Huravee Building. Due to reasons unknown only 9 member were able to run out the gate with 2 members remaining inside. As the attackers noticed the patrol running out of the HQ they intensified the fire towards them and additionally a member of the patrol slipped and was unable to use his weapon to return fire which resulted in 3 member of the patrol being killed under fire. The remaining 6 members completed their mission and returned inside the base through the same gate.

The mission is undoubtedly the most daring in the modern military history of the country. The soldiers who volunteered for the mission undertook it with full knowledge that they were venturing out a HQ which was under siege and into the hail of bullets from the attackers. And Maj. Gen Jaleel holds a legendary status in the MNDF as the commander who led this mission.

Minister of Defence and National Security
After the controversial dismissal of the then Defence Minister Colonel (Rtd.) Mohamed Nazim, Moosa Ali Jaleel was appointed as the Minister of Defence and National Security on 20 January 2015. Prior to the appointment of Defence Minister, Moosa Ali Jaleel was serving as the High Commissioner of the Maldives to Pakistan.

Family
Maj. General Jaleel has 5 children, from previous marriages.

References

Maldivian military personnel
Living people
1960 births
People from Malé
Government ministers of the Maldives
National Defence College, India alumni
Defence Services Staff College alumni